Chandra Amarakone Karunaratne is a Sri Lankan politician and a former member of the Parliament of Sri Lanka.

In 1989 she was elected to the seat of Badulla, representing the United National Party. She served as the Minister of State of Women's Affairs

References

Living people
Year of birth missing (living people)
Members of the 9th Parliament of Sri Lanka
United National Party politicians